Teter is an unincorporated community in Upshur County, West Virginia, United States.

See also
 Teterville, Kansas

References 

Unincorporated communities in West Virginia
Unincorporated communities in Upshur County, West Virginia